Gustave Pierre Drouineau (22 February 1798 – 19 April 1878) was a 19th-century French novelist, poet and playwright.

Biography 
Coming from a family of doctors of La Rochelle, he moved to Paris to study law and live from poetry. In 1826 he obtained a great success with his romantic drama Rienzi which would tour Europe, experience numerous translations and may have been a source of inspiration to Richard Wagner for his opera Rienzi (1828). His plays were presented on the most important Parisian stages of his time including the Théâtre de la Porte-Saint-Martin, the Théâtre de l'Odéon, and the Théâtre de l'Ambigu-Comique.

His novel Ernest ou le travers du siècle published in 1829 by Timothée Dehay became a best-seller, inspiring even Balzac for his Illusions perdues (1837). The following novels did not experience the same success. After the death of his wife from consumption, he immersed himself in spirituality. In 1833, he founded a sect which he named neo-Christianity and stopped definitively writing in 1835. His family had then him interned at the hospice of Lafond hospice where he plunged into total oblivion and ended his life.

Works 

1823: Épître à Casimir Delavigne, sur ses ouvrages
1824: Épître à quelques poètes panégyristes
1826: Trois nuits de Napoléon, 2 vol.
1826: Rienzi, tribun de Rome, tragedy in 5 acts
1828: L'Écrivain public, drama in 3 acts, in prose, with Merville
1828: L'Espion, drama in 5 acts, in prose, with Louis Marie Fontan and Léon Halévy
1829: Ernest, ou Le travers du siècle, 5 vol.
1829: Le Fou, drama in 3 acts, with Antony Béraud and Alexis Decomberousse
1830: Lettre à M. Cauchois-Lemaire
1830: Françoise de Rimini, drama in 5 acts, in verses
1830: Le Soleil de la liberté
1832: Le Manuscrit vert, 2 vol.
1833: Les Ombrages, contes spiritualistes
1834: L'Ironie
1834: Confessions poétiques
1834: Le livre de beauté
1834: Celeste, 2 vol.
1834: Résignée, 2 vol.
1834: Pensées du ciel et de la solitude de Pierre-Justin Maurice, foreword, 
1876: Ernest Dutouquet. Œuvres posthumes, théâtre, poésie diverses, posthumous

Bibliography 
 Eugène Fromentin, Émile Beltrémieux, Gustave Drouineau, 1969
 Brian Juden, Traditions orphiques et tendances mystiques dans le romantisme français, 1971, (p. 426)
 Robert Sabatier, Histoire de la poésie française, vol.5, 1977, (p. 24)
 Madeleine Ambrière, Précis de littérature française du XIXe siècle, 1990, (p. 173)
 Michel Prigent, Histoire de la France littéraire: Modernités : XIXe - XXe, 2006, (p. 595)
 James Thompson, Barbara Wright, Eugène Fromentin, 1820-1876: visions d'Algérie et d'Egypte, 2008,

External links 

 Aurore Hillairet, L’écrivain renié par sa ville : Gustave Drouineau (1798-1878) sur le site du CTHS

19th-century French novelists
19th-century French poets
19th-century French dramatists and playwrights
People from La Rochelle
1798 births
1878 deaths